The Columbus Globe for State and Industry Leaders (also known as Hitler's Globe or the Führer Globe) was a unique globe designed for Adolf Hitler and his Nazi Party.

Made in Berlin in the 1930s, the Columbus Globe for State and Industry Leaders was located in Hitler's office throughout most of its existence. It became widely known in the United States after comedian Charlie Chaplin parodied it in his 1940 film The Great Dictator. Comedy group The Three Stooges also made fun of it in two of their short subject comedies. One of the two limited editions was looted by John Barsamian, a private in the U.S. Army, at Hitler's summer retreat shortly after the war and sold 60 years later at an auction in San Francisco for $100,000. The globe in Hitler's office replaced Ethiopia with Italian East Africa and was known for its size as well as manufacturing cost.

Origin
Two limited editions of the globe were made in Berlin in the mid 1930s: one for the Nazi Party and another one specifically for Hitler. The one made for Hitler was nearly the size of a Volkswagen Beetle and manufactured at a great expense. It changed Abyssinia (today's Ethiopia) to Italian East Africa. The other was made of standard wood with no special features. The actual number of globes produced cannot be verified as the factory that produced the globe, along with its archives, was destroyed in air raids in 1943.

Wolfram Pobanz, Polish historian and globe enthusiast, believes that even though it was located in his office, Hitler was probably not particularly fond of the globe, declaring:

In 1938, Hitler decided that the old Reich Chancellery was not big enough to house the ministries of Nazi Germany. He assigned his favorite architect Albert Speer to build the new Chancellery. After the massive renovations were completed in early 1939 per Hitler's insistence, the globe was moved to the Hitler's new office located at the heart of the new Chancellery, where it remained until the Soviets occupied the building in April 1945.

Whereabouts
Numerous globes purported to have been owned by Hitler exist throughout the world, although the authenticity of many of them is doubtful. There are a total of three in Berlin: one at a geographical institute, another at the Marcher Museum, and the third at the German Historical Museum. Another two reside in public collections in Munich. Many of the globes show Germany with a bullet hole or simply wiped out, an act committed out of contempt by either Soviet or American soldiers.

Based on photographic evidence, none of these globes are the iconic one from Hitler's office in the Chancellery.

In May 1945, one globe allegedly owned by Hitler was found by American soldier John Barsamian among the ruins of the Berghof, Hitler's home on the Obersalzberg near Berchtesgaden, where he often lived when not in Berlin. The house had been nearly completely looted by the time Barsamian arrived. He took the globe home and kept it for 60 years before selling it at an auction in San Francisco in 2007. Bob Pritikin, an entrepreneur from San Francisco, bought the globe for $100,000, five times the original estimated price of $20,000.

In September 2007, the historian Wolfram Pobanz declared that the copy of the giant globe with a bullet hole in the Deutsches Historisches Museum in Berlin is not Hitler's, but another one that is thought to have belonged to Joachim von Ribbentrop, the Nazi foreign minister, and with no clue as to where the Globe that belonged to Hitler is today.

Legacy
The globe is regarded as an iconic representation of Adolf Hitler's alleged megalomaniacal desire for world conquest.  It features in Hollywood's first satire of Hitler and the Nazis, The Three Stooges' short subject You Nazty Spy!, released in January 1940.

In Charlie Chaplin's The Great Dictator, released in October 1940, the globe is portrayed as a beach ball that bursts in front of the face of dictator "Adenoid Hynkel".

In the Three Stooges' I'll Never Heil Again, a sequel to You Nazty Spy! released in July 1941, the "Axel" partners of Moronikan dictator "Moe Hailstone" play a game of keep away with the globe. Hailstone's military commander, "Field Marshal Herring," eventually smashes the globe over Hailstone's head.

References

Sources

External links
 The Great Dictator – Globe Scene on YouTube

Adolf Hitler
20th-century maps and globes